Jack Heather Newman (July 1903 – 22 August 1976) was an Australian middle-distance runner. He competed in the men's 800 metres and 1500 metres at the 1924 Summer Olympics.

References

External links
 

1903 births
1976 deaths
Athletes (track and field) at the 1924 Summer Olympics
Australian male middle-distance runners
Olympic athletes of Australia
Athletes from Melbourne